Zac Lomax (born 24 September 1999) is an Australian professional rugby league footballer who plays as a  for the St George Illawarra Dragons in the National Rugby League (NRL).

Early life
Lomax was born in Temora, New South Wales, Australia.

He played his junior rugby league for the Temora Dragons, where he once scored 40 points in a game that ended 100–0.

Career

Early career 
Lomax is a graduate of the Illawarra Steelers' SG Ball team and was named in both the Australian Schoolboys and NSW Under-18s teams in 2016 and 2017. In 2017, Lomax was awarded NSWRL's Under-18s Player of the Year.

2018 
Lomax made his NRL debut for St. George Illawarra in round 10 of the 2018 NRL season against South Sydney.
Lomax played in both finals games for St. George Illawarra in the 2018 NRL season.  Lomax kicked three goals in week one of the finals series as St. George Illawarra defeated Brisbane 48–18 in an upset victory at Suncorp Stadium.  The following week, Lomax kicked four goals as St. George Illawarra were defeated by Souths 13–12 at ANZ Stadium in the elimination final.
Lomax was named in the Prime Ministers XIII, New South Wales U18 for 2018, and also appeared in Brad Fittler's Emerging Blues camp, Zac also scored 5 goals in the PM XIII 34–18 win over PNG.
On 15 August 2018 Lomax re-signed with St. George Illawarra until the end of the 2020 NRL season.

2019 
In the 2019 season Lomax played 10 games, scoring five tries and 15 goals before injuring his thumb at training, he returned in the round 19 loss against South Sydney. In December 2019, Lomax extended his contract until the end of the 2025 season.

2020
In round 11 of the 2020 NRL season, Lomax scored two tries and kick four goals in a 28–24 loss against rivals Cronulla-Sutherland at Kogarah Oval.

In round 13 against the Sydney Roosters, Lomax scored two tries and kicked two goals in a 24–16 loss at WIN Stadium.

In round 19, Lomax scored two tries in a 42–18 defeat to Newcastle at McDonald Jones Stadium.

In October, Lomax was named in the New South Wales State of Origin preliminary squad.

2021
In round 3 of the 2021 NRL season, Lomax scored two tries and kicked seven goals in a 38–12 victory over Manly-Warringah at WIN Stadium.

In round 8 against the Wests Tigers, Lomax suffered a suspected broken thumb in the club's 16–8 loss at WIN Stadium.

Lomax played a total of 12 matches for St. George Illawarra in the 2021 NRL season as the club finished 11th on the table and missed out on the finals.

2022
During round 2 of the National Rugby League, Lomax was penalized for a professional foul against the Penrith Panthers in their 20-16 loss.
In round 6 of the National Rugby League, Lomax was involved in an incident during a try celebration where he decided to jump on the back of former teammate Tyson Frizell. Lomax was given a grade one contrary conduct charge and fined $1,000 by the judiciary.
In round 24, Lomax kicked a penalty goal in the final minute to win the game for St. George Illawarra 24-22 over the Wests Tigers. The result meant that the Wests Tigers would finish with the Wooden Spoon for the first time in their history.
Lomax played 24 games for St. George Illawarra throughout the year and finished as the clubs top point scorer with 167 points.
Lomax was selected for the Prime Minister's XIII on the 25 September, which he scored 20 points including one try and eight conversions.

Statistics

Controversy
On 5 July 2021, Lomax was fined $31,000 by the NRL and suspended for one game after breaching the game's Covid-19 biosecurity protocols when he  attended a party along with 12 other St. George Illawarra players at Paul Vaughan's property.

Personal life
Lomax has an older brother Hayden Lomax who is currently in the development squad for the St. George Illawarra Dragons.

Lomax had a partner Jessica Sergis who plays in the NRL Women's Premiership. Due to COVID-19 protocols Sergis had to move out of their shared household in 2020. They split in 2021 due to unknown reasons.

In 2022 it was confirmed that Lomax has a new partner, Tahlia Thornton, who is a swimmer and swims for the Australian Swim Team.

References

External links

St. George Illawarra Dragons profile

1999 births
Living people
Australian rugby league players
St. George Illawarra Dragons players
Rugby league centres
Rugby league players from Temora, New South Wales